Charleval is a commune in the Eure department in northern France.

History
Formerly known as Noyon-sur-Andelle, it was renamed Charleval in honour of King Charles IX.

The Château de Charleval (begun 1570, unfinished, disappeared) was designed by Jacques I Androuet du Cerceau, who engraved his designs and published them in 1579.

Population

See also
Communes of the Eure department

References

Communes of Eure